WLLS (99.3 FM) is a radio station in Beulah, Michigan. The station, which began broadcasting in 1979, is owned by Traverse City broadcaster Roy E. Henderson under the "Fort Bend Broadcasting" banner and has long been the primary local station for the Frankfort area and Benzie County. It was formerly simulcast on WCUZ 100.1 FM licensed to Bear Lake, Michigan, which now airs a talk format as Talk Radio 1340 WMTE (although the actual WMTE-AM 1340 remains silent as of July 2012).

WLLS's coverage area does not extend far east of Traverse City and Cadillac to protect co-channel WATZ-FM in Alpena, but the station can be heard across Lake Michigan in parts of northeastern Wisconsin.

History
The station was originally WBNZ, which aired some kind of adult contemporary or Hot AC music format for many years (and continues to do so on 92.3 FM). WBNZ was also heavily involved in the Frankfort/Benzie County community, with local news and high-school sports coverage.

In July 2009, the WBNZ call sign moved to 92.3 (formerly WOUF 92.1) and the 99.3 allotment became WOUF 99.3 The Wolf, which aired a Mainstream Rock format mixing New and Classic Rock. The station's competition included Northern Radio's Classic Rocker WKLT (which Henderson founded but sold off in the 1980s) and Northern Star Broadcasting's classic rock WGFN "The Bear" and mainstream rocker WJZJ ("Real Rock"). WOUF retained its city of license of Beulah with the move to 99.3, and WBNZ retained its city of license of Frankfort with the move to 92.3.

On January 21, 2015, WOUF went silent. On January 26, 2017, WOUF returned to the air with a simulcast of adult contemporary-formatted WLDR-FM as "The Bay".

On September 30, 2018, WOUF changed its call sign to WQAN. On October 1, 2018, WQAN switched from a simulcast of WLDR-FM to a simulcast of album-oriented rock-formatted WQON 100.3 FM Grayling.

In October 2019, WQAN went silent (off the air).

WQAN was found broadcasting from an unauthorized location. https://docs.fcc.gov/public/attachments/DOC-358715A1.pdf

On October 1, 2020, WQAN changed their call letters to WLLS.

References

WBNZ is Back! Popular radio station will focus on local news, events and sports, from The Grand Traverse Insider (4 August 2008)

External links

LLS
Radio stations established in 1979
1979 establishments in Michigan